The 2007–08 Sacramento Kings season was the 63rd season of the franchise, 59th in the National Basketball Association (NBA) and 23rd in Sacramento.

Key dates prior to the start of the season:
 The 2007 NBA draft took place in New York City on June 28.
 The free agency period began in July.

Off-season notes
The Kings, following a disappointing 2006–07 season, fired coach Eric Musselman and replaced him with Reggie Theus.

Draft picks
Sacramento's selections from the 2007 NBA draft in New York City.

Other notable additions 
Daniel Artest, the brother of Ron Artest, made it on the summer league roster and practice squad. Artest scored two points as a back-up in limited summer league action.

Roster

Standings

Record vs. opponents

Game log

October
Record: 0–1; Home: 0–0; Road: 0–1

November
Record: 5–8; Home: 5–2; Road: 0–6

December
Record: 6–4; Home: 3–2; Road: 3–2

January
Record: ; Home: ; Road:

February
Record: ; Home: ; Road:

March
Record: ; Home: ; Road:

April
Record: ; Home: ; Road:

 Green background indicates win.
 Red background indicates regulation loss.
 White background indicates overtime/shootout loss.

Player stats

Regular season 

*Statistics include only games with the Kings

Awards and records

Records

Milestones

Transactions
The Kings were involved in the following transactions during the 2007–08 season.

Trades

Free agents

See also
 2007–08 NBA season

Sacramento Kings seasons
2007–08 NBA season by team
Sacramento
Sacramento